Instant Replay is the third full-length album from singer-songwriter Dan Hartman. Released in 1978, where all the album tracks reached number 1 on the American dance chart. The title track/first single peaked at number 29 on the Hot 100 in the U.S. & number 8 in the United Kingdom. The follow-up single, "This Is It", was only a minor Hot 100 hit, reaching number 91 in 1979, while rising to number 18 in the U.K.

Track listing
All songs written and arranged by Dan Hartman.

"Instant Replay" 5:19
"Countdown/This Is It" 14:07
"Double-O-Love" 5:56
"Chocolate Box" 2:52
"Love is a Natural" 6:17
"Time & Space" 4:55

Charts

Production
Produced and engineered by Dan Hartman
Mixed by Tom Moulton

Personnel
Dan Hartman - lead and backing vocals, rhythm and bass guitars, keyboards, all instruments on "Chocolate Box", all instruments except saxophone and congas on "Instant Replay"
Blanche Napoleon - backing vocals
Vinnie Vincent - rhythm and acoustic guitars, tambourine, backing vocals
G.E. Smith - rhythm and lead guitars
Edgar Winter - saxophone on "Instant Replay" and "Countdown/This Is It"
Hilly Michaels - drums, percussion
Larry Washington - congas on "Instant Replay"
Salsoul Orchestra - orchestra (uncredited)

References

1978 albums
Dan Hartman albums
Albums arranged by Gene Page
Albums produced by Dan Hartman
Blue Sky Records albums
Epic Records albums